Michael "Misha" Shmerkin (born 5 February 1970) is an Israeli former competitive figure skater. He is a two-time  Skate Canada International silver medalist (1994 and 1995), 1993 Ondrej Nepela Memorial champion, and 1995 Skate Israel champion. He competed in the final segment at two Winter Olympics (1994, 1998), six World Championships, and four European Championships. He is currently a figure skating teacher/coach for many young adults and children . He is located in Brooklyn and Staten Island, New York.

Career
Early in his career, Shmerkin competed internationally for the Soviet Union, most notably at the 1984 World Junior Championships, where he placed fifth.

Shmerkin moved with his family to Israel in 1991, and Shmerkin began representing his new country in international competition.

At the 1994 Winter Olympics, where he placed 16th, Shmerkin became the first skater to represent Israel at the Olympic Games. He placed 18th at the 1998 Winter Olympics.

In the late 1990s he skated to Jewish songs and had a tallis and menorah embroidered on his costume.

He retired from competitive skating following the 2001/2002 season.

Shmerkin currently coaches in New York.

Programs

Competitive highlights
GP: Champions Series (Grand Prix)

See also
List of select Jewish figure skaters

References

External links
 
 Skate.org bio
 Jews in Sports bio
 "Jewish Life at the Olympics"

1970 births
Sportspeople from Odesa
Soviet male single skaters
Israeli male single skaters
Olympic figure skaters of Israel
Figure skaters at the 1994 Winter Olympics
Figure skaters at the 1998 Winter Olympics
Soviet emigrants to Israel
Living people